Coldstream River, a watercourse of the Clarence River catchment, is located in the Northern Rivers district of New South Wales, Australia.

Course and features
Coldstream River rises below Glenugie Peak, near Brown Knob Trignometric Station and flows generally north by east, before reaching its confluence with the South Arm of the Clarence River, near Tyndale; descending  over its  course; as it flows through Yuraygir National Park and past the village of Tucabia.

See also

Rivers of New South Wales

References

 

Rivers of New South Wales
Northern Rivers